The National Evangelical Church of Beirut (NEC) is a reformed church in Beirut, member of the National Evangelical Church Union of Lebanon.

History
Established in the Lebanese capital, Beirut, in 1848 by Congregational and Presbyterian American missionaries, the NEC is the oldest and the largest of nine congregations situated outside Beirut in the towns of Abeih, Aramoun, Khaldeh, Kafarshima, Hadath, Dbayyeh, Jdeideh and Dhour el-Shweir.

The National Evangelical Church of Beirut is the headquarters and administrative centre of these nine churches which operate under the name of the National Evangelical Union of Lebanon (NEUL).

In 1870, the first Evangelical Church was built to house the Arabic and English speaking congregations. During the next hundred years, the church was the centre for all the activities and celebrations of both communities. Then during the Lebanese civil war (1975–1990) it was totally destroyed except for the bell tower and its congregation consequently scattered.

Since its reconstruction in 1998, the National Evangelical Church of Beirut has been standing again in the heart of Beirut's Central District, re-gathering its people with its worship services presided by Rev. Dr. Habib Badr as well as with its many socio-cultural and educational activities.

On 4 August 2020, the church was badly damaged in the Beirut explosion, when all of its stained glass windows were blown out.

See also
 Protestantism in Lebanon

References

External links
The National Evangelical Church of Beirut
Johann Ludwig Schneller Schule
Middle-East Council of Churches
The Near East School of Theology
Association of Churches and Missions in South Western Germany

Protestant churches in Lebanon
Churches in Beirut
2020 Beirut explosion
Religious organizations established in 1848
1848 establishments in Asia
Churches completed in 1870
Churches completed in 1998